Mohammadu Naizer Mohamed Fasal (born 30 April 1990), commonly known as Mohammadu Fasal, is a Sri Lankan footballer who currently plays as a forward for Colombo.

Career

International
He made his international debut on March 12, 2015, in the match against Bhutan valid for the 2018 FIFA World Cup qualification, entering the seventy-fifth instead of Madushan de Silva.

References

External links

Living people
Sri Lanka international footballers
1990 births
Sri Lankan footballers
Association football forwards
Colombo FC players
Sri Lanka Football Premier League players